The Maulkuerfgesetz (Luxembourgish; "Muzzle law") was a proposed 1937 law in Luxembourg. Officially, it was entitled the "Law for the Defence of the Political and Social Order" but was nicknamed Maulkuerfgesetz by its opponents. The law would have allowed the Luxembourgish government to ban the Communist Party and dissolve any political organisation which they believed might endanger the constitutional institutions. The members of these parties or organisations would be stripped of their political offices and could not be employed by the state or by local governments.

The law was rejected in a referendum on 6 June 1937, and therefore never came into force.

Background

The origins of the "Law for the defence of the political and social order", also named the Loi Bech after the prime minister Joseph Bech, go back to the year 1934. The government, a coalition of the Right Party and the Radical Liberal Party, put the proposed law to the Chamber of Deputies on 2 May 1935. Little happened from then to December 1936.

The parties supporting the Bech Ministry, the Right Party and the Liberals, were in favour of the law, the opposition (consisting of the Socialists and other left-wing parties) were not. It took almost 3 years until the law's text was clarified. To understand how a party that received just 9% of the vote in the Chamber elections (many of them protest votes) was seen as such a threat that it had to be banned, one must look at the political context of the time. Especially for the Christian-conservatives, communism was the embodiment of all evil; the Liberals, as representatives of industry and the world of business, were not much more well-disposed. Additionally, the prime minister Joseph Bech had never been a friend of universal suffrage, introduced in 1919, and was nostalgic for census suffrage for the rest of his life.

Chamber vote and referendum

The debate in the Chamber started on 16 April 1937, and lasted 4 days. On 23 April the law was adopted by a majority (34 votes for, 19 against, 1 abstention).

After the vote, however, opposition in the country increased rather than fading away, and therefore the Bech government decided to put the matter to a referendum. It was convinced that, with the support of the Luxemburger Wort and the Catholic Church, they would receive the population's assent. To many people's surprise, a slim majority (50,67 %) rejected the law on 6 June 1937.

Aftermath

Joseph Bech then offered his government's resignation to the Grand Duchess. The latter did not accept it immediately, and so it took until 5 November 1937 for the new Dupong-Krier Ministry to be sworn in, with Joseph Bech as Foreign Minister, Minister for Wine-growing, and Arts and Sciences.

References

Further reading
 Gilbert Trausch: "Joseph Bech, la loi d'ordre et la force des choses en 1937", in: Luxemburger Wort, 17 February 1987, reprinted in Un passé resté vivant. Mélanges d'Histoire luxembourgeoise. Lions Club Luxembourg Doyen 1995, p. 127-142.
 "Demokratie in Gefahr". Dossier in Forum Nr 97 (1987), p. 11-54 (articles by Michel Pauly, Claude Wey, Lucien Blau, Georges Buechler, Paul Dostert, Henri Wehenkel, Marc Lentz, Simone Beck, Téid Fischbach-Zenner, Jean-Paul Lehners, Lambert Schlechter).
 Kmec, Sonja & Péporté, Pit (eds), 2012. Lieux de mémoire au Luxembourg II. Jeux d'échelles. Erinnerungsorte in Luxemburg II. Perspektivenwechsel. p. 31-36. Imprimerie Saint-Paul. 
 Henri Koch-Kent: Ils ont dit NON au fascisme. Rejet de la loi muselière par le référendum de 1937.; 1982; 109 S.

Proposed laws
Anti-communism
1937 in Luxembourg
Political history of Luxembourg
Emergency laws
History of Luxembourg (1890–1945)
1937 in law